Stephen Haddelsey   is a British author and historian specializing in Antarctic exploration. He earned his doctorate degree at the University of East Anglia, of which he is an Honorary Research Fellow. He is a fellow of both the Royal Geographical Society and the Royal Historical Society. Since 2015 he has worked at the University of Lincoln.

Early writings

Haddelsey's first book was a critical reappraisal of the novels of the nineteenth century Anglo-Irish writer Charles Lever (1806–72), published in 2000 under the title Charles Lever: The Lost Victorian.

Antarctic research

Haddelsey is the author of several books on the history of British and Commonwealth Antarctic exploration, including biographies of Frank Bickerton, mechanical engineer on the Australasian Antarctic Expedition of 1911-14 and Joseph Russell Stenhouse, who commanded the Aurora on the Imperial Trans-Antarctic Expedition of 1914-17. Haddelsey is a distant relative of Frank Bickerton. More recently, Haddelsey has focused on "post-Heroic" expeditions, including Operation Tabarin and the Commonwealth Trans-Antarctic Expedition of 1955-58 led by Sir Vivian Fuchs. He has edited and introduced Andrew Taylor's Two Years Below the Horn: A Personal Memoir of Operation Tabarin, which was published by The Erskine Press in 2017.

He is also a contributor to the Polar Record (Cambridge University Press).

Awards

In 2016, Operation Tabarin: Britain's Secret Wartime Expedition to Antarctica, 1944-46 was awarded the Manitoba Day Award, "which recognizes users of archives who have completed an original work of excellence which contributes to the understanding of Manitoba history".

Partial bibliography
Operation Tabarin: Britain's Secret Wartime Expedition to Antarctica, 1944-46 (The History Press, 2014) - With Alan Carroll
Shackleton's Dream: Fuchs, Hillary & the Crossing of Antarctica (The History Press, 2012)
Ice Captain: The Life of J.R. Stenhouse (Sutton Publishing, 2008)
Born Adventurer: The Life of Frank Bickerton, Antarctic Pioneer (Sutton Publishing, 2005)
Charles Lever: The Lost Victorian (Colin Smythe Ltd, 2000)
Icy Graves: Exploration and Death in the Antarctic (The History Press, 2018)

References

21st-century British historians
21st-century British non-fiction writers
Living people
Year of birth missing (living people)
Place of birth missing (living people)
Alumni of the University of East Anglia
Academics of the University of Lincoln